Peter Paul Maria Alberdingk Thijm (21 October 1827, at Amsterdam – 1 February 1904, at Leuven) was a Dutch academic and writer.

Life

He made his studies in his home city, at first at the Gymnasium and later at the Athenaeum, from which he graduated in letters and history in 1857. For some years he was instructor in history in Maastricht. After being called to a professorship in the Catholic University of Leuven in 1870, he succeeded in establishing a chair for the special study of the history of the literature of the Netherlands. 

He was vice president of the student association "Met Tijd en Vlijt" and of "Constantius Buter". He was also the member of the Royal Academy of Dutch language and literature, and for a time, its president. From 1888 on, Paul Thijm edited the periodical Dietsche Warande, which he transplanted into Belgium.

He was the first chairman of the Davidsfonds (1875 - 1878).

Family

The writer Joseph Albert Alberdingk Thijm was his brother.

Works

His main works are: 

"De H. Willibrord, Apostel der Nederlanden" (1867);
"Karel de groote en zijne eeuw" (1866);
"De gestichten van liefdadigheid in België, van Karel de Groote tot aan de XVIde eeuw", awarded a prize by the Royal Academy of Science, Letters and Fine Arts of Belgium (1883);
"Schets der Algemeene Geschiedenis" (1870);
"Vroolijke historie van Ph. van Marnix" (1876);
"Spiegel van Nederlandsche letteren" (1877).

References

Attribution
 The entry cites:
Dietsche Warande en Belfort (Antwerp-Ghent, 1904);
Levensgeschiedenissen van de leden der Maatschappij van Letterkunde te Leiden (Leyden, 1904).

1827 births
1904 deaths
Dutch male writers
Writers from Amsterdam